40th Regiment, 40th Infantry Regiment or 40th Armoured Regiment may refer to:

Infantry regiments
 40th (2nd Somersetshire) Regiment of Foot, a unit of the United Kingdom Army
 40th Infantry Regiment, a unit of the United States Army

Armoured regiments
 40th Armor Regiment, a unit of the United States Army
 40th Cavalry Regiment, a unit of the United States Army
 40th (The King's) Royal Tank Regiment, a unit of the United Kingdom Army
 40th/41st Royal Tank Regiment, a unit of the United Kingdom Army

Artillery regiments
 40th Regiment Royal Artillery, a unit of the United Kingdom Army

Aviation regiments
 40th Fighter Aviation Regiment, a unit of the Yugoslav Air Force

Communications regiments
 40 (Ulster) Signal Regiment, a unit of the United Kingdom Army

American Civil War regiments
 40th Illinois Volunteer Infantry Regiment, a unit of the Union (Northern) Army during the American Civil War 
 40th Iowa Volunteer Infantry Regiment, a unit of the Union (Northern) Army during the American Civil War 
 40th Wisconsin Volunteer Infantry Regiment, a unit of the Union (Northern) Army during the American Civil War 
 40th New York Volunteer Infantry Regiment, a unit of the Union (Northern) Army during the American Civil War

See also
 40th Division (disambiguation)
 40th Brigade (disambiguation)
 40th Battalion (disambiguation)
 40th Squadron (disambiguation)